Tuczępy may refer to the following places:
Tuczępy, Greater Poland Voivodeship (west-central Poland)
Tuczępy, Lublin Voivodeship (east Poland)
Tuczępy, Świętokrzyskie Voivodeship (south-central Poland)
Tuczępy, Strzelce-Drezdenko County in Lubusz Voivodeship (west Poland)